H. scandens may refer to:
 Hibbertia scandens, the snake vine, climbing Guinea flower or golden Guinea vine, a plant species native to Australia
 Humulus scandens, a synonym for Humulus japonicus, a plant species